USS Nebraska may refer to:

 was the name given to the never commissioned  monitor Shakamaxon in 1869
 is an  launched in 1992 and currently on active duty

See also
 , an auxiliary  launched in 1968 currently in ready reserve since 1993.

United States Navy ship names